Charles Bertin Gaston Chapuis de Tourville (1740 in Hettange-Grande – November 22, 1809 in Cattenom), Divisional General during the French Revolution and the First French Empire.

He became Maréchal de camp (major general) on 12 July 1792 and divisional general on 8 March 1793. He died on 22 November 1809.

French commanders of the Napoleonic Wars
1740 births
1809 deaths